Banevreh  is a  city in Shiveh Sar Rural District, Bayangan District, Paveh County, Kermanshah Province, Iran. At the 2006 census, its population was 3,139, in 689 families.

References 

Populated places in Paveh County
Cities in Kermanshah Province
Kurdish settlements in Kermanshah Province